Kisangara River is located in the central  Kilimanjaro Region, Tanzania. It begins in North Pare Mountains in Mwanga District and drains in the Nyumba ya Mungu Reservoir on the border with Simanjiro District in Manyara Region.

References

Rivers of Kilimanjaro Region
Rivers of Tanzania